Marius Constantin Antonescu (born 9 August 1992) is a Romanian rugby union player. He plays as a lock. 

He plays for Tarbes in France. 

He has 10 caps for Romania, since his debut in 2014, and still has to score his first points. Antonescu was part of the squad at the 2015 Rugby World Cup, playing a single game, as a substitute.

References

External links

Living people
1992 births
Romanian rugby union players
Romania international rugby union players
US Colomiers players
Rugby union locks
Union Sportive Bressane players
People from Mangalia
Tarbes Pyrénées Rugby players
Expatriate rugby union players in France
Romanian expatriate rugby union players
Romanian expatriate sportspeople in France